Posyolok sovkhoza Pavlovka is a rural locality (a settlement) in Posevkinskoye Rural Settlement, Gribanovsky  District, Voronezh Oblast, Russia. The population was 341 as of 2010. There are 6 streets.

Geography 
The settlement is located 41 km northeast of Gribanovsky (the district's administrative centre) by road. Posevkino is the nearest rural locality.

References 

Rural localities in Gribanovsky District